A general election were held in the U.S. state of Vermont in 2022. All of Vermont's executive officers were up for election as well as Vermont's Class 3 U.S. Senate seat and its lone seat in the U.S. House of Representatives.

U.S. Senate

U.S. House

Governor

Lieutenant Governor

Attorney General

State Treasurer 

Incumbent state treasurer Beth Pearce is eligible to seek a sixth term in office, but is instead choosing to retire due to a diagnosis of cancer.

Democratic primary

Candidates

Nominee 
Mike Pieciak, former commissioner of the Vermont Department of Financial Regulation

Declined 
Beth Pearce, incumbent state treasurer (endorsed Pieciak)

Endorsements

Republican primary 
After winning the primary, Paige indicated that he would drop out and let the Vermont Republican Party choose a replacement nominee. However, the party's executive committee could not find another candidate in time, and Paige continued as the Republican nominee.

Candidates

Nominee 
H. Brooke Paige, newsstand owner and perennial candidate

Withdrew before primary 
Kevin Divney, financial analyst

Declined 
Wendy Wilton, former Rutland City Treasurer, former state representative, and nominee for state treasurer in 2012

Progressive primary

Candidates

Withdrew after winning primary 
Don Schramm, cofounder of Burlington Co-housing

Secretary of State 

Incumbent secretary of state Jim Condos is retiring.

Democratic primary

Candidates

Nominee 

 Sarah Copeland-Hanzas, state representative

Eliminated in Primary 
John Odum, Montpelier city clerk
Chris Winters, Vermont Deputy Secretary of State and former Berlin school board member

Declined 
Jim Condos, incumbent secretary of state

Endorsements

Republican primary

Candidates

Nominee 
H. Brooke Paige, newsstand owner and perennial candidate

Progressive primary

Candidates

Withdrew after winning primary 
Robert Millar, former Winooski city councillor and school board member

State Auditor 

Incumbent state auditor Doug Hoffer is running for re-election to a fifth term in office.

Democratic primary

Candidates

Declared 
Doug Hoffer, incumbent state auditor

Republican primary

Candidates

Withdrew after winning primary 
H. Brooke Paige, newsstand owner and perennial candidate

Replacement nominee 
Richard Morton, chair of the Windham County Republican Party and nominee for Vermont State Treasurer in 2018 (also running for state senate)

Progressive primary

Candidates

Withdrew after winning primary 
Marielle Blais, vice chair of the Vermont Progressive Party

Replacement nominee 
Doug Hoffer, incumbent state auditor (cross-endorsement of the Democratic nominee)

General Assembly

Ballot measures

References

External links 
Candidates at Vote Smart
Candidates at Ballotpedia
Campaign finance at OpenSecrets

2022 Vermont elections
Vermont